Duke Peter Alexandrovich of Oldenburg (21 November 1868 – 11 March 1924) was the first husband of Grand Duchess Olga Alexandrovna of Russia, the youngest sister of Tsar Nicholas II.

Biography

Early life
He was born in Saint Petersburg in the Oldenburg Palace (present-day site of Saint-Petersburg State University of Culture and Arts), the only child of Duke Alexander Petrovich of Oldenburg (1844–1932) and Princess Eugenia Maximilianovna of Leuchtenberg (1845–1925). His mother was a granddaughter of Tsar Nicholas I of Russia through Nicholas's daughter, Grand Duchess Maria Nikolayevna, and his father was a great-grandson of Tsar Paul I of Russia through his paternal grandmother Grand Duchess Catherine Pavlovna. He was known by the name of "Petya".

Marriage
In 1900, he began to escort the 18-year-old Grand Duchess Olga Alexandrovna (1882–1960), the youngest daughter of the late Tsar Alexander III and younger sister to the reigning Tsar Nicholas II, to the theatre and opera. His proposal of marriage the following year came as a surprise to Olga, who later explained, "I was so taken aback that all I could say was 'thank you'". She assumed that Oldenburg was pushed into proposing by his ambitious mother. Perhaps Olga accepted his proposal to gain independence from her mother, or avoid marriage into a foreign court. The marriage was announced in May 1901, and was unexpected by many, as Oldenburg had shown no prior interest in women. The Dowager Empress Maria Feodorovna wrote to her son, Tsar Nicholas II, "I am sure you won't believe what has happened. Olga is engaged to Petya and both are very happy. I had to consent, but it was all done so quickly and unexpectedly that I still cannot believe it." Tsar Nicholas replied to his mother, "...I cannot believe Olga is actually engaged to Petya. They were probably both drunk yesterday. ... We both laughed so much reading your note that we have not recovered yet." A prenuptial agreement drawn up by a committee of the Tsar, the Oldenburg family, and government ministers, promised Olga an annuity of 100,000 rubles from the Tsar, and one million rubles to be deposited in a fund from which she could draw interest.

On 9 August 1901, they were married at Saint Petersburg in a grand ceremony attended by family, government ministers, foreign ambassadors, and courtiers. They honeymooned at the Ramon Palace, country estate of Oldenburg family near Voronezh, but the atmosphere was soured by a quarrel between Oldenburg and his father over gambling. Oldenburg was an inveterate and well-known gambler. The money he coaxed out of his wife was often lost at the table. In the fall of 1901, they traveled on to Biarritz, where a fire at their hotel destroyed many of Oldenburg's uniforms and medals, including a specially-commissioned Danish Order of the Elephant from Fabergé. Olga's uncle-by-marriage, England's King Edward VII, lent them a yacht, in which they sailed to Sorrento. On their return to Russia, they moved into a palatial 200-room house at 46 Sergievskaya street, Saint Petersburg, made available to them by the Tsar.

Their marriage remained unconsummated, and Oldenburg was believed by family and friends to be homosexual. Two years after their marriage, Olga met a cavalry officer her own age, Nikolai Kulikovsky, member of Russian-Moldavian Kulikovsky noble family, to whom she was attracted. She confronted Oldenburg and asked for a divorce, which he refused with the qualification that he might reconsider after seven years. However, Oldenburg appointed Kulikovsky as an aide-de-camp, and allowed him to live in the same residence as Oldenburg and the Grand Duchess on Sergievskaya street.

Annulment
In the middle of World War I, after living separately for two years, Oldenburg's marriage to Olga was annulled on 16 October 1916. Olga married Kulikovsky the following month. After the Russian Revolution, Oldenburg and his mother managed to escape Russia, and settled in France.

An acquaintance, Senator A. A. Polovtsev, said Oldenburg "comes across as a sickly person". He was thought to be a hypochondriac, had a slender, delicate build, and preferred indoor activities to sports and outdoor pursuits.

Death
He died, aged 55, in 1924 in exile in Antibes, France, and was buried in the crypt of the Russian Orthodox St. Michael the Archangel Church, Cannes.

Ancestors

References

Sources
Crawford, Donald; Crawford, Rosemary (1997). An Innocent Abroad. New York: Scribner. 

Vorres, Ian (2001) [1964]. The Last Grand Duchess. Toronto: Key Porter Books. 

1868 births
1924 deaths
19th-century Russian LGBT people
Dukes of Oldenburg
Emigrants from the Russian Empire to France
LGBT royalty
Royalty from Saint Petersburg

Honorary Knights Grand Cross of the Royal Victorian Order
Recipients of the Cross of Honour of the Order of the Dannebrog
20th-century LGBT people